Otap (sometimes spelled utap) is an oval-shaped puff pastry cookie from the Philippines, especially common in Cebu where it originated. It usually consists of a combination of flour, shortening, coconut, and sugar. It is similar to the French palmier cookies, but compared to the French cookies, are not so much heart-shaped and more tightly layered and thinner, making it crispier. In order to achieve the  texture of the pastry, it must undergo an eleven-stage baking process.

See also
 Hojaldres
 Apas (biscuit)
 Palmier

References

External links
Short description of utap

Culture of Cebu
Puff pastry
Foods containing coconut
Philippine pastries